Gordon Albert Yea (13 November 1924 – 12 August 2020) was an Australian rules footballer who played with North Melbourne in the Victorian Football League (VFL). He died in August 2020 at the age of 95.

Notes

External links 

1924 births
2020 deaths
Australian rules footballers from Victoria (Australia)
North Melbourne Football Club players